FC Dinamo Sokhumi is a Georgian association football club from Sokhumi, Georgia, temporarily based in Tbilisi.

The most successful club of Abkhazian ASSR currently competes in Regionuli Liga, the fifth tier of Georgian championship.

History

In the Soviet leagues
Founded in 1925, Dinamo Sukhumi took part in the Soviet football league system since 1936. The club long played in the Soviet Second League and brought up several well known Soviet football players. Among them were Nikita Simonyan, Valter Sanaya, Daur Akhvlediani, Avtandil Gogoberidze, Akhrik Tsveiba, Gennadi Bondaruk, Georgy Grammatikopulo, Temuri Ketsbaia and Ruslan Adzhindzhal who all started their professional career at Dinamo Sukhumi or spent significant amount of time at the club.

In 1960s Dinamo spent several seasons in Class B of the Soviet third division. From 1971 to 1990, apart from three seasons (1974-76), they competed in different zones of the Soviet Second league. In the Soviet Cup competition Dinamo achieved their biggest success in 1987 when they reached 1/8 finals, having eliminated Spartak Ordzhonikidze from the First league and Dinamo Minsk, the Supreme League club. 

In 1989 the club clinched the title, won a subsequent play-off tournament and for the first time in their history got promoted to the First League.   

Overall results achieved by Dinamo Sukhumi in II league are the following: 

 
Meanwhile, in early 1990, Georgian Football Federation established new Umaglesi Liga.  An absolute majority of Georgian football clubs, including Dinamo Tbilisi and Torpedo Kutaisi, withdrew from the Soviet league. In contrast, Dinamo Sukhumi chose to remain in the Soviet football system where they played in the First League two more seasons up until 1991. This political issue divided Dinamo Sukhumi. While ten players decided to remain in the club, most players and members of the staff  opted for participation in the Georgian top league. For this purpose they formed new club FC Tskhumi Sukhumi.

With the formal collapse of USSR in the dying days of 1991 all Soviet leagues were abolished. As a result, there was no tournament left where Dinamo could participate in 1992. In August the war in Abkhazia, Georgia, broke out and all Abkhazian football clubs were temporarily dissolved.

After 2000

In early 2000 the club resumed functioning in Tbilisi. In 2005-06 they played in the top division of Georgian championship, but due to financial problems they were gradually relegated to lower leagues. 

Since 2013 Dinamo have been competing in Regionuli Liga.

Achievements
SSR Georgia Champion: 2
1947, 1948

Seasons in the Soviet leagues
{|class="wikitable"
|-bgcolor="#efefef"
! Season
! League
! Pos.
! Pl.
! W
! D
! L
! GF
! GA
! P
!Cup
!Notes
!    Manager
|-
|1988
|bgcolor=#98bb98|3
|align=right|12
|align=right|38||align=right|18||align=right|7||align=right|13
|align=right|55||align=right|42||align=right|43
|1/8
|
|
|-
|1989
|bgcolor=#98bb98|3
|align=right|1
|align=right|42 ||align=right|29 ||align=right| 7||align=right|6
|align=right| 92||align=right|35 ||align=right|65 
|1/64
|play-off won, promoted
|
|-
|-
|1990
|bgcolor=#ffa07a|2
|align=right|12
|align=right|38||align=right|14||align=right|8||align=right|16
|align=right|36||align=right|41||align=right|36
|1/64
|
|
|-
|1991
|bgcolor=#ffa07a|2
|align=right|10
|align=right|42||align=right|16||align=right|11||align=right|15
|align=right|50||align=right|50||align=right|43
|1/64
|
|
|-
|}

Notable players

Other teams
Dinamo Sukhumi also have junior and women's teams. The latter currently taking part in division 1 of Georgian women's league secured the bronze medals in the 2022 season. Their reserve team is represented in the second tier.

In late December 2020 head coach Davit Tavartkiladze and team captain Tamar Akhlobadze were awarded a special governmental prize for their contribution to development of the Abkhazian football. Dinamo Sukhumi is the first club in the South Caucasus to have formed a football academy for women.

Colours and badge
Dinamo's traditional kit colours were blue and white. Their crest was of a blue letter "D", written in a traditional cursive style, on a white background with the name of their home town "Sukhumi" written in front of a football underneath.

References

 
Football clubs in Georgia (country)
Association football clubs established in 1927
Football in Abkhazia
Association football clubs disestablished in 1991
1991 disestablishments in Georgia (country)
Sport in Sukhumi